This is the first edition of the tournament.

Seeds

Draw

Finals

Top half

Bottom half

References

External links
Main draw
Qualifying draw

Challenger Club Els Gorchs - 1